Susan Osborn may refer to:

Susan Osborn (musician)
Susan Osborn (writer)

See also
Susan Osborne, mayor of Boulder, Colorado